HD 1690 is a 9th magnitude orange giant star located approximately 2,500 light-years away in the constellation of Cetus. It is a single star, and is the host star to one known extrasolar planet.

Characteristics 
HD 1690 is an evolved K-type giant star. Its age is estimated at 6.7 billion years (two billion years older than the Sun) and its radius is given at 16.7 solar radii. Its metallicity is 30% that of the sun. Despite being an orange giant, its distance gives it an apparent magnitude of 9.178, too faint to be visible to the naked eye or with binoculars. HD 1690 has no known companion star, making it a single star system.

Planetary system 
In 2010, a team of astronomers led by astronomer C. Moutou of the High Accuracy Radial Velocity Planet Searcher performed a radial-velocity analysis that detected a gas giant planet in orbit around HD 1690. 

The planet HD 1690 b has a very eccentric (far from circular) orbit; its orbital eccentricity is 0.64. This eccentricity suggests that its mass is at least six times that of Jupiter, classifying it as a super-Jupiter. Other planets in the HD 1690 system are unlikely unless they are located on unstable crossing orbital paths.

References 

1690
1692
K-type giants
Cetus (constellation)
Planetary systems with one confirmed planet
Durchmusterung objects
J00211332-0816521